The list of saints of the Dominican Order here is alphabetical. It includes Dominican saints from Europe, Asia, Africa and the Americas. Since the founder of the Dominicans, Saint Dominic, was canonized in 1234, there have been 69 other Dominicans canonized. Ingrid of Skänninge and Paul and Ninety Companions, however, have not been canonized.

A 

 Agnes of Montepulciano (1268-1317), prioress in medieval Tuscany.
 Albertus Magnus (before 1200–1280), German friar and bishop, Doctor of the Church.
  (1694-1748), Spanish priest, one of the Martyr Saints of China.
  (1830-1861), Spanish priest, one of the Vietnamese Martyrs.
  (1702-1745), Spanish priest, one of the Vietnamese Martyrs.
 Giordano Ansaloni (1598-1634), Italian friar, missionary to the Philippines and Japan, one of the 16 Martyrs of Japan.
 Antoninus of Florence (1389-1459), Italian friar, archbishop of Florence.
 Thomas Aquinas (1225-1274), Italian friar and philosopher, Doctor of the Church.

B 
 Bartholomew of Braga (1514-1590), Portuguese friar, archbishop of Braga.
 Zdislava Berka (c.1220-1252), Czech convent foundress, wife of Havel of Markvartice.
 Louis Bertrand (1526-1581), Spanish friar, missionary to South America.
 Jose Gabriel del Rosario Brochero (1840-1914), Argentine priest, known as the "Gaucho priest".
  (c.1801-1839), Vietnamese catechist, one of the Vietnamese Martyrs.

C 
  (-1859), Vietnamese priest, one of the Vietnamese Martyrs.
 Francis Ferdinand de Capillas (1607-1648), Spanish friar, one of the Martyr Saints of China.
  (1743-1773), Spanish friar, one of the Vietnamese Martyrs.
 Catherine of Ricci (1522-1590), Italian nun, prioress of the Convent of St Vincent.
 Catherine of Siena (1347-1380), tertiary from Siena, Doctor of the Church.
  (1762-1838), Spanish friar, one of the Vietnamese Martyrs.
 Francisco Coll Guitart (1812-1875), Spanish priest, founder of the Dominican Sisters of the Annunciation of the Blessed Virgin.
 Guillaume Courtet (1589-1637), French priest, missionary to Japan, one of the 16 Martyrs of Japan.

D 
  (1713-1748), Spanish priest, one of the Martyr Saints of China.
  (c.1783-1839), Vietnamese priest, one of the Vietnamese Martyrs.
  (c.1765-1840), Vietnamese priest, one of the Vietnamese Martyrs.
  (c.1764-1838), Vietnamese priest, one of the Vietnamese Martyrs.
 Dominic de Guzmán (1170-1221), Spanish priest, founder of the Dominican Order.

E 
 Domingo Ibáñez de Erquicia (c.1589-1633), Spanish friar, missionary to the Philippines and Japan, one of the 16 Martyrs of Japan.

F 
  (1775-1838), Spanish priest, one of the Vietnamese Martyrs.
 Vincent Ferrer (1350-1419), Valencian friar and preacher, missionary across Europe.

G 
 Marie-Alphonsine Danil Ghattas (1843-1927), Palestinian nun, founder of the Dominican Sisters of the Most Holy Rosary of Jerusalem.
  (1702-1745), Spanish priest, missionary to the Philippines and Japan, one of the Vietnamese Martyrs.
 Antonio Gonzalez (c.1593-1637), Spanish friar, missionary to the Philippines and Japan, one of the 16 Martyrs of Japan.
  (1594-1633), Spanish priest, missionary to the Philippines and Japan, one of the 16 Martyrs of Japan.

H 
  (1765-1838), Spanish priest, one of the Vietnamese Martyrs.
  (1800-1861), Spanish priest, one of the Vietnamese Martyrs.
 Hyacinth of Poland (1185-1257), Polish priest and missionary, reformer of women's missionaries in Poland.

I 
 Ingrid of Skänninge (1200s-1282), Swedish abbess, foundress of Skänninge Abbey.

J 
 John of Cologne (1500s-1572), Dutch friar, one of the Martyrs of Gorkum.

K 
  (c.1779-1860), Vietnamese priest, one of the Vietnamese Martyrs.

M 
 John Macias (1585-1645), Spanish friar, missionary to Peru.
 Margaret of Hungary (1242-1270), Hungarian nun, niece of Saint Elizabeth of Hungary.
  (c.1794-1858), Vietnamese priest, one of the Vietnamese Martyrs.
  (1598-1637), Spanish priest, missionary to the Philippines and Japan, one of the 16 Martyrs of Japan.
 Louis de Montfort (1673-1716), French priest, known for his particular devotion to the Blessed Virgin Mary.

N 
  (c.1775-1838), Vietnamese catechist, one of the Vietnamese Martyrs.
  (c.1832-1861), Vietnamese catechist, one of the Vietnamese Martyrs.
  (c.1811-1839), Vietnamese tailor, one of the Vietnamese Martyrs.
  (1772-1838), Vietnamese priest, one of the Vietnamese Martyrs.
  (c.1806-1839), Vietnamese lay, one of the Vietnamese Martyrs.
  (c.1796-1838), Vietnamese priest, one of the Vietnamese Martyrs.
  (c.1813-1839), Vietnamese lay, one of the Vietnamese Martyrs.
  (c.1786-1839), Vietnamese priest, one of the Vietnamese Martyrs.

P 
 Paul and Ninety Companions (-1240), Hungarian martyrs.
 Peter of Verona (1206-1252), Italian friar and preacher, Inquisitor in Lombardy.
 Pope Pius V (1504-1572), Bishop of Rome, standardized the Roman Rite, instituted the feast of Our Lady of Victory.
 Martin de Porres (1579-1639), Peruvian lay brother, patron saint of mixed-race people.

R 
 Raymond of Penyafort (c.1175-1275), Catalan friar, patron saint of canon lawyers.
  (1590-1634), Japanese priest, one of the 16 Martyrs of Japan.
 Rose of Lima (1586-1617), Peruvian lay, primary patroness of Peru and co-patroness of the Philippines.
  (1691-1748), Spanish priest, one of the Martyr Saints of China.

S 

  (1821-1858), Spanish priest, Titular Bishop of Tricomia, one of the Vietnamese Martyrs.
  (1818-1857), Spanish priest, Titular Bishop of Platea, one of the Vietnamese Martyrs.
 Peter Sanz (1680-1747), Catalan friar, one of the Martyr Saints of China.
  (1695-1748), Spanish titular bishop of Tipasa, Apostolic Vicar of Fuzhou, one of the Martyr Saints of China.
  (c.1576-1637), Japanese priest, one of the 16 Martyrs of Japan.

T 
  (c.1764-1840), Vietnamese catechist, one of the Vietnamese Martyrs.
 Jacobo Kyushei Tomonaga (c.1582-1633), Japanese priest, one of the 16 Martyrs of Japan.
  (c.1792-1840), Vietnamese priest, one of the Vietnamese Martyrs.
  (c.1821-1861), Vietnamese priest, one of the Vietnamese Martyrs.

V 
  (1827-1861), Basque friar, Titular Bishop of Centuria, one of the Vietnamese Martyrs.
 Vicente Liem de la Paz (1732-1773), Vietnamese friar, one of the Vietnamese Martyrs.
  (c.1775-1839), Vietnamese priest, one of the Vietnamese Martyrs.

See also 
 Vietnamese Martyrs
 Japanese Martyrs
 Chinese Martyrs

References

List
Lists of Roman Catholics